Lonely For The Last Time is the first full-length album by Seven Places on BEC Recordings.

Track listing
 "Yours"  - (3:22) 
 "Everything"  - (3:23) 
 "Landslide"  - (2:36) 
 "Like It Never Happened"  - (3:07) 
 "It Might Be Today"  - (3:31) 
 "Along the Way"  - (3:52) 
 "Lonely For The Last Time  - (3:33) 
 "Thinking It Over"  - (3:28) 
 "Into Your Heart"  - (3:03) 
 "Stay The Same"  - (2:59) 
 "The Western Wall"  - (3:38) 
 "Little"  - (5:41) 
 "Awakening"  - (4:07) 
 "Nothing Gold Can Stay"  - (3:17) 
 "Sleepers"  - (4:06) 

The newer version of Lonely For The Last Time has two other songs. They are titled "Nothing Gold Can Stay" and "Sleepers".

Album credits
 Produced by Aaron Sprinkle
 Mixed by JR McNeely
 All songs written by Seven Places and John Mark Comer

References 

Seven Places albums
2003 albums
Albums produced by Aaron Sprinkle